The Vanishing West is a 1928 American silent Western film serial directed by Richard Thorpe. The film is considered to be lost.

Cast
 Jack Perrin as Jack Marvin
 Eileen Sedgwick as Betty Kincaid
 Jack Dougherty as Jim Marvin (as Jack Daugherty)
 Yakima Canutt as Steve Marvin
 Leo D. Maloney as Jack Trent
 William Fairbanks as Long Collins
 Mickey Bennett as Wally Lee (as Little Mickey Bennett)
 Helen Gibson as Mrs. Kincaid
 Bob Burns as Robert Lee
 Fred Church
 Harry Lorraine

See also
 List of film serials
 List of film serials by studio

References

External links
 

1928 films
American silent serial films
1928 Western (genre) films
American black-and-white films
Mascot Pictures film serials
Films directed by Richard Thorpe
Lost Western (genre) films
Lost American films
Films produced by Nat Levine
1928 lost films
Silent American Western (genre) films
1920s American films